Dmitri Nikolayevich Vlasov (born 2 January 1973) is a Russian professional football coach and a former player.

Club career
He made his professional debut in the Soviet Second League B in 1990 for PFC CSKA-2 Moscow. He played 1 game in the UEFA Intertoto Cup 1997 for FC Lokomotiv Nizhny Novgorod.

Personal life
He is the older brother of Vadim Vlasov.

References

1973 births
Living people
Footballers from Moscow
Soviet footballers
Russian footballers
Association football defenders
PFC CSKA Moscow players
FC Tyumen players
FC Lokomotiv Nizhny Novgorod players
FC Fakel Voronezh players
Russian Premier League players
Russian football managers